Torre de Moncorvo is a municipality in the district of Bragança in Portugal. The population in 2011 was 8,572, in an area of 531.56 km².

The present mayor is Nuno Gonçalves, elected by the PSD.

Torre de Moncorvo is also a well-developed and promising mining area. Iron ore is mined at the Mua Mine by Aethel Partners. The municipal holiday is March 19.  In early November, the directorate-general for energy and geology (DGEG) authorised Aethel to control the Torre de Moncorvo iron mine, a company that hopes to put Portugal in a leading position in European mining.

Parishes

Administratively, the municipality is divided into 13 civil parishes (freguesias):

 Açoreira
 Adeganha e Cardanha
 Cabeça Boa
 Carviçais
 Castedo
 Felgar e Souto da Velha
 Felgueiras e Maçores
 Horta da Vilariça
 Larinho
 Lousa
 Mós
 Torre de Moncorvo
 Urrós e Peredo dos Castelhanos

Famous people
According to a study by Antonio Andrade, Argentinian writer Jorge Luis Borges had Portuguese ancestry: Borges's great-grandfather, Francisco, was born in Portugal in 1770, and lived in Torre de Moncorvo, before he emigrated to Argentina.

Climate 
Torre de Moncorvo has a Mediterranean climate with warm to very hot, dry summers and cool, wet winters, depending on the altitude.

References

External links
Municipality official website

Municipalities of Bragança District